Patrick F. Landers III (born September 20, 1959 in Springfield, Massachusetts) is an American politician who represented the 1st Hampden District in the Massachusetts House of Representatives from 1987–1999 and was the assistant state treasurer for debt management from 1999–2007.

He subsequently became a senior vice president at Lehman Brothers.

References

1959 births
Democratic Party members of the Massachusetts House of Representatives
Politicians from Springfield, Massachusetts
University of Massachusetts Amherst alumni
Suffolk University alumni
Living people
People from Palmer, Massachusetts
Lehman Brothers people